This is a list of African-American newspapers that have been published in the state of Oklahoma.  It includes both current and historical newspapers.  The first known African-American newspaper in Oklahoma was the Oklahoma Guide (distinct from the later Guthrie publication of the same name), which was a monthly newspaper published in Oklahoma City in 1889.  The state's first weekly African-American newspaper was The Langston City Herald in 1891. 

Many of these early Oklahoma newspapers were published in the many all-Black towns established after the Land Run of 1889. Langston City in particular was home to eleven newspapers from 1891 to 1913.

Notable African-American newspapers in Oklahoma today include The Black Chronicle of Oklahoma City and The Oklahoma Eagle of Tulsa.

Newspapers

See also 
List of African-American newspapers and media outlets
List of African-American newspapers in Colorado
List of African-American newspapers in Kansas
List of African-American newspapers in Missouri
List of African-American newspapers in New Mexico
List of African-American newspapers in Texas
List of newspapers in Oklahoma

Works cited

References 

Newspapers
Oklahoma
African-American
African-American newspapers